Wanquan Township is a township under the administration of Jiangle County, Fujian, China. , it has 9 villages under its administration.

References 

Township-level divisions of Fujian
Jiangle County